Arkady Ilyich Ostashev (30 September 1925 – 12 July 1998), was a Russian mechanical engineer who participated in the Soviet Union's first launch of the Sputnik, and of the first cosmonaut. He was a Candidate of Technical Sciences, docent, laureate of the Lenin and state prizes, senior test pilot of missiles and space-rocket complexes of OKB-1 as well as a companion of Sergey Korolev, the head of the Soviet space program.

Biography 

Born on 30 September 1925, in the village Maly Vasilyev, Noginsky District, Moscow Oblast, USSR. In his school years Arkady, together with his elder brother Yevgeny, under the leadership of the magazine "Knowledge is power", designed and assembled a telescope with a 10-fold increase with the necessary bed and a mechanism of rotation in two planes, lenses for the eyepiece and the objective sent to the editorial Board of the journal free of charge. It observed the Moon , they dreamed of flying to the planets of the Solar System. A. I. Ostashev in 1942 graduated from 9 classes of Middle school No. 32, Elektrougli, Noginsky District, Moscow region. After finishing school 2.5 months he studied at the preparatory courses at Moscow Aviation Institute and got a degree program of grade 10, the results of which had been enrolled in the MAI them. S. Ordzhonikidze. In the fourth year of the Institute A.I. Ostashev managed to learn German documents on rocketry, obtained by a group of specialists sent by the country's leadership in Germany after the war. After a careful study made by the German specialists in missile development of A.I. Ostashev finally decided on the theme of his diploma project : «the Composite Rocket with a winged last stage", with спецчастью – stability of motion of the cruise stage. Diploma with this theme wrote under the direction of S. P. Korolev in Podlipki (city). 

From 1947 until graduating from the Aviation Institute in 1948, A. I. Ostashev worked in Department No. 3 of the special design bureau of the Research Institute-88 of the Ministry of Defense Industry as a senior technician and under the guidance of Sergei Pavlovich Korolev prepared a diploma for defense. On this enterprise A.I. Ostashev worked for more than 50 years  in positions from an engineer to the head of the complex. In 1952 he graduated from the VIC (higher engineering courses) in BMSTU, in the same year he graduated from the University of Marxism–Leninism in Mytishchi city Committee of the CPSU. In 1956 Arkady Ilyich joined the ranks of the CPSU. In 1975, A.I. Ostashev was the head of testing of the rocket-space systems according to the Russian-American program "ASTP" . All the scientific and engineering activities A. I. Ostashev since 1948 connected with development and introduction of the system of tests of missiles and rocket-space complexes. At the preliminary design of a famous "SEVEN" R-7, under the guidance of A. I. Ostashev was created volume № 14 fully dedicated to the testing of missiles. Arkady Ilyich author and co-author of over 200 scientific papers , articles and inventions. In addition to engineering and scientific work he was leading and teaching. Since 1964, he was Docent (Department "Integrated system for measurement of aircraft") MAI them. S. Ordzhonikidze, lectured at the Department No. 308.

A. I. Ostashev died on 12 July 1998, in Moscow. Personal will and testament Arkady Ilyich Ostashev he was cremated for burial in the grave of the elder brother Ostashev Yevgeny Ilyich. In December 1998, after obtaining the relevant approvals and permits from the leadership of Kazakhstan dust A. I. Ostashev was moved by his wife and son in Baikonur (city) and buried in the grave of his older brother Ostashev Yevgeny Ilyich, who died on 24 October 1960 41 site  the Baikonur cosmodrome in preparation for the launch of Intercontinental ballistic missile R-16.

Awards 

 Two Order of Lenin (1957, 1961)
 Two Order of the Red Banner of Labour (1956, 1976)
 Medal "For Valiant Labour in the Great Patriotic War 1941–1945"
 Medal "Veteran of Labour"
 Jubilee Medal "In Commemoration of the 100th Anniversary since the Birth of Vladimir Il'ich Lenin"
 other medals
 Gratitude President of the Russian Federation (9 April 1996 г.) — for a great personal contribution to the development of Russian cosmonautics

For the results achieved in his professional activity, A. I. Ostashev was awarded a personal pension of republican significance ( characteristics for assigning a personal pension).

Memory 
In the museum at site No. 2 of the Baikonur cosmodrome organized an exposition dedicated to him. In Elektrougli, Noginsky District, Moscow region at the local history Museum has a booth dedicated to the Ostashev brothers. There is a memorial plaque at the house him grew up in. In the Museum of the enterprise, where A. I. Ostashev worked for more than 50 years, there is material, dedicated to him. In 1993 in the Russian state archive for scientific-technical documentation placed documents from the personal archives of A. I. Ostashev.

Publications 
A. I. Ostashev has publications in books, ("Academician S. P. Korolyov scientist, engineer, man", "the Beginning of the space era", "an Unforgettable Baikonur", "Soyuz-Apollo" and others), magazines (The magazine "Russian space No. 10 2015, Our heritage 97/2011, Science and life № 1 1997 and others) and the papers on the following topics: test RKT, the history of the development of cosmonautics history of development SKB-3, OKB-1, TsKBEM, NPO "Energy" and RSC "Energia". In the early 1990s Arkady Ilyich was a frequent guest at the Memorial house-Museum of academician Korolev. He came to "tell" his memories on a tape recorder. From the memoirs of the Director of the Memorial house-Museum of academician Korolev L. A. Filinoy:
...Arkady Ilyich leads the whole Deposit of episodes from the life of S. P. Korolev, Moscow and Baikonur, but in the stories he never emphasizes its role, sometimes leading, as if he was there and only. This ability to look from the side, being in the center of events, the wilful detachment allows to him, like the custodian of the great MYSTERIES of TIME, keep it to once share the secret, tell you first hand... And more. Over the years, you realize that the most difficult thing in life, oddly enough, is the ability to be grateful to people, without the statute of limitations of the good done to you. This quality was given to S. P. Korolev. So the book "Sergey Pavlovich Korolev-The Genius of the XX century" was written not only by the best student of the Korolev School, the most talented test pilot of rocket technology of the XX century, but also by a very honest person who remained forever grateful and devoted to the Chief Designer.
In 1997, the American writer J.. Harford published the book «Korolev» , (John Wiley & Sons, Inc., New York City, 1997.) materials for which the author collected a few years. J.. Harford met with Ostashev and interviews were used in the book, but with some mistakes. Having received from the author instance and translating it into Russian, A.I. Ostashev wrote a letter of protest to the author. After the death of Ostashev in 2001 and 2005 there were published two editions of his book «the Test of rocket and space technology business of my life. Events and facts». In 2010 published the book "Sergei Pavlovich Korolev is the Genius of the twentieth century" lifetime personal memoirs about academician S. P. Korolev (M. GOU VPO MSFU ), materials for which A. I. Ostashev collected from the moment of the enterprise, headed by S. P. Korolev, and until 1998. Gennady Artamonov, one of Ostashev's colleagues, wrote the following poem about him:  
Rocket fire tried to get away,
But could not, and she froze...
In granite black
Memory we still have to go
In the Park of silence, the silence of the plates.
October the Baikonur not forgotten.
And now here without unnecessary big words
"Come" and lay down Arkady Ostashev.
He came to his brother, to relax,
Maybe with him to pass the eternal path.
Burning steppes, and melt concrete...
October he will not forget the polygon.

References

Further reading 
About A. I. Ostasheve written in books:
 "S. P. Korolev Father" N. S. Koroleva, Moscow, Nauka, 2007. 
 "Rockets and people" – B. E. Chertok, M: "mechanical engineering", 1999.  
 «Notes rocketeer» – Vasily Mishin, OOO Publishing and Polygraphic company "Lavatera", 2013. 
 "The hidden space" – Nikolai Kamanin, М: "Inforteks-if", 1995.
 «A breakthrough in space» – Konstantin Vasilyevich Gerchik, M: LLC "Veles", 1994. 
 "Korolev: Facts and myths" – J. K. Golovanov, M: Nauka, 1994. 
 "Top secret General" – E.T. Beloglazova, M: "the Heroes of the Fatherland", 2005. 
 "The cosmic heights – from the depth of centuries" Kaliningrad – Korolev – R. D. Позамантир, L. K. Bondarenko, M: "Moscow journal", 1998.
 «At risk» – A. A. Toul, Kaluga, "the Golden path", 2001. 
 "Melua, A.I." " Rocket technology, cosmonautics and artillery. Biographies of scientists and specialists.- 2nd ed., supplement, St. Petersburg: "Humanistics", 2005. С. 355. ISBN 5-86050-243-5 
 "People duty and honor" – A. A. Shmelev, "libris", 1996. 
 
 "Behind the wall of secret " - A. A. Koreshkov, Vladimir, "CAI "Cathedral", 2010 - .
 "People duty and honor" – A. A. Shmelev, the second book. M: Editorial Board "Moscow journal", 1998.
 "Telemetry OKB-1" – A.S. Loskutov
 "Telemetry. The eyes and ears of the chief designer" – В.И. Сковорода-Luzin.- M: "Overlay", 2009. 
 "Space with a cheerful face" Y. Markov, CPI Mask 2011. 
 "Unknown Baikonur" – edited by B. I. Posysaeva, M.: "globe", 2001. 
 "Rocket and space feat Baikonur" – Vladimir Порошков, the "Patriot" publishers 2007. 
 "Bank of the Universe" – edited by Boltenko A. C., Kiev, 2014., publishing house "Phoenix", 
 "S. P. Korolev. Encyclopedia of life and creativity" – edited by C. A. Lopota, RSC Energia. S. P. Korolev, 2014 
 "To stand on the way to space" – Author: Valentin Lebedev, M: publisher ITRK in 2016, 
 "Red Moon Rising: Sputnik and the Hidden Rivalries that Ignited the Space Age" by Matthew Brzezinski, Henry Holt and Company, 2008. 
 "We grew hearts in Baikonur" – Author: Eliseev V. I. M: publisher OAO MPK in 2018, 
 "Space science city Korolev" – Author: Posamentir R. D. M: publisher SP Struchenevsky O. V., 
 "Flight tests of rocket and space technology. Time. Spaceports. People. " – Author: Posysaev Boris Ivanovich Mozhaisk: publisher Mozhaisk printing plant, 2020. 
 "I look back and have no regrets. " – Author: Abramov, Anatoly Petrovich: publisher "New format" Barnaul, 2022. 
 "History in faces and destiniesv" – Author: Posamentir R. D. M: publisher SP Struchenevsky O. V.,

External links

 
 Осташев Arkady Ilyich. Online exhibition from the series «Archive and personality: cooperation for history»  
  Ostashev A.I. on page «Cosmic memorial» 
 Trooper of the Royal school // "Kaliningradskaya Pravda" 
 Brothers Ostashev from Elektrougli // "news Agency suburbs" 
 Famous people of the city of Elektrogli 
 Calendar encyclopedia of cosmonautics // A. Zheleznyakov.
 Another meeting with Korolev // "Kaliningradskaya Pravda" 
 Memories lead investigator OKB-1 A. I. Ostashev "Unforgettable days" on the days before the start of Y. A. Gagarin // "the Federal archival Agency" 
 The order of the President of the Russian Federation of 09.04.1996, 
 Memories of S. P. Korolev. Section 4. S. P. Korolev – organizer 
 
 
 
 Memoirs of a veteran of the rocket and space Corporation Energia, a companion of S. P. Korolev, test engineer space-rocket complexes, laureate of Lenin and State prizes of the USSR Arcadia Ilyich Ostashev
 The Russian educational portal of the NGO "World of Science and Culture".  Cosmic calendar. 30 September
 Photo of pokoritelya space
 Memories of S. P. Korolev.Section 3. Designer  
 The history of RSC Energia since 1946 till 2011. Three volumes of electronically.
 Arkady Ostashev //Family history 
 Ostashev A. I. electronic memorial 
 Eduard Shcherbakov "A cohort of pioneers"
 Popular science magazine "Russian Space", № 10, 2015, p. 46 – a Tribe of titans 
 The newspaper Moskovsky Komsomolets  // The disaster at Baikonur 
 All-Russian public organization of veterans – the RUSSIAN COUNCIL of VETERANS 
 The Russian Union Of Veterans // Day of memory and grief.
 Space feat Eugene Ostashev//Newspaper "ELEKTROUGLI DAY by DAY" 12 April 2011.
 Rocket science and Cosmonautics of Russia. Biographical Encyclopedia 
 "All about space" magazine.
 The first military satellites of the USSR // Weekly newspaper "Military-industrial courier" No. 1 2022. 
  Portal of the history of the Moscow Aviation Institute 
 For the 50th anniversary of the flight of Yuri Gagarin //Press note No. 3 |Jan – APR| 2011. 
 Read the book "Sergei Pavlovich Korolev - the genius of the XX century: lifetime personal memories of academician S.P. Korolev" 
 List of OKB-1 employees involved in the preparation and launch of the Vostok-1 spacecraft 
 "Academic Bulletin" 2012, No. 109, page 7  

 Memoirs of a military test pilot (1953-1957) Major General V. S. Patrushev, Honored Test Pilot of Baikonur 

1925 births
1998 deaths
Moscow Aviation Institute alumni
Academic staff of Moscow Aviation Institute
Soviet scientists
Soviet engineers
Soviet space program personnel
Soviet spaceflight pioneers
20th-century Russian engineers
Russian mechanical engineers
Russian aerospace engineers
Communist Party of the Soviet Union members
Soviet communists
Recipients of the Order of Lenin
Lenin Prize winners
Recipients of the USSR State Prize
Baikonur Cosmodrome
Employees of RSC Energia